Adésànyà is a Yoruba surname originating from the phrase adé san ìyà meaning "the crown or royalty avenges my suffering". Notable people with the surname include:

 Abraham Adesanya (1922–2008), Nigerian politician
 Ayo Adesanya (born 1969), Nigerian actress, film director and producer
 Israel Adesanya (born 1989), Nigerian-born New Zealand mixed martial artist, kickboxer, and boxer
 Jason Adesanya (born 1993), Belgian footballer
 Saburi Adesanya, Nigerian academic and writer
 Sekinat Adesanya (born 1987), Nigerian sprinter

References 

Yoruba-language surnames